Liszt is a Hungarian surname that means "flour".

Notable people with the surname include:

 Franz Liszt (1811–1886), Hungarian composer and pianist
 Adam Liszt (1776–1827), father of Franz Liszt
 Anna Liszt (1788–1866), mother of Franz Liszt
 Cosima Liszt (1837–1930), daughter of Franz Liszt, later the wife of Richard Wagner
 Franz von Liszt (1851–1919), German jurist, cousin of Franz Liszt
 Catherine A. Liszt, pen name of Janet Hardy

See also 
 3910 Liszt, main-belt asteroid, named after the composer
 
 List (surname), a predominantly German, identical sounding surname that may be a simplification of Liszt (or vice versa the latter a magyarized version of the former)

Liszt